Kane 103.7 FM, also known as Kane FM, is a UK local community radio station, broadcasting on FM and online across Guildford in Surrey and in the surrounding areas.

History 
Kane FM started as a pirate radio station in the early 1990s. The opportunity arose in 2004 to prove the demand for the service through a Restricted Service Licence running 28 days.

It has since grown into a community radio station to benefit the youth of tomorrow. All profits generated are used to drive social gain and community cohesion. Donations can be made online via the official website. We welcome sponsors and new advertisers, please contact Kane FM through the web site.

On 24 February 2010 Ofcom awarded Kane FM with a Community Radio Licence, and the station successfully re-applied for National Lottery funding to build their new studios and office.

Kane FM officially begun broadcasting on 28 October 2011 on 103.7FM and online.

Sponsorship and advertising 
Through advertising bi-hourly between shows, Kane FM also receive local sponsorship from businesses and services and trades in and around the Guildford area.

Local charity events and fundraisers are also advertised between shows, usually as prerecorded public service announcements or described by the presenters as part of their show.

Events 
At Guilfest, a summer weekend event formerly held in Guildford, The Funky End Tent was presented by Kane FM – where a number of DJs, producers and MCs hosted several sets across a variety of dance music genres, as well as some huge names in music like Andy C and Benga.

In 2012 some of the Producers and DJs from Kane FM participated in the London to Brighton Bike Ride, and through advertising on their own shows accumulated over £2000 in sponsorship for the British Heart Foundation.

References

External links 
 Official Website

Former pirate radio stations
Community radio stations in the United Kingdom
Radio stations in Surrey